Chandranath Sinha is an Indian politician and the present Minister for fisheries in the Government of West Bengal. He is also a Member of the Legislative Assembly, elected from the Bolpur constituency in  West Bengal state assembly election, 2011 and 2016 respectively.

References 

State cabinet ministers of West Bengal
Trinamool Congress politicians from West Bengal
Living people
1962 births